Chazey Heath is a hamlet in Oxfordshire, England, about  north of Reading, Berkshire. It is situated on the A4074 road, between Caversham and Oxford, at its junction with the rural road to Goring Heath and Goring-on-Thames. For local government purposes Chazey Heath is in Mapledurham civil parish, which forms part of the district of South Oxfordshire within the county of Oxfordshire. It is within the Henley constituency of the United Kingdom Parliament. Prior to Brexit in 2020, it was represented by the South East England constituency for the European Parliament.

There are also two golf clubs, the Caversham Heath Golf Club and the Mapledurham Golf Club, on opposite sides of the road. This hamlet contains 62 buildings (53 houses). It has a local park situated by the border of Tokers Green. It is neighbour to Reading, a major town around 0.2 miles from The Pack Saddle Pub. It has 3 primary schools and 3  secondary schools. The primary schools are: Kidmore End Primary, Sonning Common Primary and Peppard Primary. The secondary schools are: Chiltern Edge School, Gillots School and Langtree School.

Gallery

References

External links

Hamlets in Oxfordshire
South Oxfordshire District